Bohuslän is a Swedish province in Götaland, on the northernmost part of the country's west coast. It is bordered by Dalsland to the northeast, Västergötland to the southeast, the Skagerrak arm of the North Sea to the west, and the county of Østfold, in Norway, to the north. In English it literally means Bohus County, although it shared counties with the city of Gothenburg prior to the 1998 county merger and thus was not an administrative unit in its own right.

Bohuslän is named after the medieval Norwegian castle of Bohus. Under the name Baahuslen, it was a Norwegian county from the Norwegian conquest of the region from the Geats and subsequent unification of the country in the 870s until the Treaty of Roskilde in 1658, when the union of Denmark–Norway was forced to cede this county, as well as Skåneland (part of Denmark proper), to Sweden.

Administration 
The provinces of Sweden serve no administrative function. Instead, that function is served by the counties of Sweden. For centuries, the administrative county for Bohuslän was Gothenburg and Bohus County, and as its name implies it consisted of the entire Bohuslän province together with the city Gothenburg. In 1998, some Swedish counties were merged to reduce administration costs, and Gothenburg and Bohus County were therefore merged into the new, much larger Västra Götaland County.

Heraldry 
Bohuslän was granted its arms at the time of the funeral for Charles X Gustav of Sweden in 1660. It was identical to the arms of the Town of Kungälv. In 1962 the higher claim of the town was established and a variation for the arms of the county was introduced. The coat of arms is surmounted by a ducal coronet. Blazon: 'Argent, a Castle embattled Gules with one embattled Tower of the same and two doors Or hinged Sable between a Sword point upwards and Lion rampant holding the Tower both Azure langued and armed Or."

Geography 

The geography is distinguished by the rocky coast, bordering an archipelago: there are about 3,000 islands and 5,000 islets (skerries). These make up the northern part of the Gothenburg archipelago, Sweden's second largest after Stockholm archipelago. In old days, the seascape was renowned for its many reefs and sunken rocks which caused many shipwrecks. Two of the largest islands, Orust and Tjörn, constitute their own municipalities. Both islands have a distinctive culture and history. However, the rocky terrain cannot be said to be mountainous: the highest point is Björnepiken at 222 meters.

Sweden's only threshold fjord, Gullmarn or Gullmarsfjorden, is located near Lysekil. The fjord is home to unique marine life.

Bohuslän's coastline was ranked 7th among the world's last great wilderness areas by CNN Travel.

Unlike other parts of Sweden, there are relatively few lakes or streams in Bohuslän: out of a total land area of  only  is freshwater. Although lakes are common, they tend to be small in size.

Geology 

Most of the coast is made up by Bohus granite formed in the aftermath of the Sveconorwegian orogeny. In detail these granites have been eroded as to contain abundant small rock basins, some of them filled with clay and silt of combined glacial and marine origin.

The coast of Bohuslän is a joint valley landscape. Studies of denudation chronology suggest Bohuslän lies at the westernmost reaches of the Sub-Cambrian peneplain; however, there is some uncerntainty on whether the hilltops are remnants of the peneplain. Rather than Sub-cambrian most of the province is made up of a relief unit known as the Sub-Mesozoic hilly peneplain.

Islands 

Björkö
Bohus Malmön
Brattön
Dyngö
Dyrön
Fotö
Grötö
Gullholmen
Hamburgö
Hisingen (partly)
Härmanö
Hyppeln
Hållö
Hälsö
Hönö
Kalvsund
Koster
Klädesholmen
Källö-Knippla
Käringön
Malmön
Marstrand
Orust
Rörö
Resö
Stenungsön
Tjörn
Vinga
Åstol
Öckerö

Larger settlements 

Bohuslän's chartered cities are:
Kungälv (approximately 1100)
Lysekil (1903)
Marstrand (approximately 1200)
Strömstad (1672)
Uddevalla (1498)

Their central areas are now non-administrative urban areas.

In addition there are several other notable settlements:

Andalen
Brastad
Björlanda
Fiskebäckskil
Fjällbacka
Grebbestad
Gothenburg (the north-western part of the city lies on Hisingen, and most of this island is in Bohuslän)
Hamburgsund
Henån
Herrestad
Hjuvik
Hunnebostrand
Kungshamn
Ljungskile
Munkedal
Rabbalshede
Rönnäng
Skärhamn
Smögen
Stenungsund
Stora Höga
Tanumshede
Torslanda
Öckerö

History 

During the 2nd millennium BCE, the Nordic Bronze Age began (c. 1700–500 BCE), including rock art such as the examples found throughout Bohuslän. During the Migration Period (300–700 CE) and the Viking Age (700–1000 CE), the area was part of Viken, and was actually known as two entities: Rånrike in the north and Elfsyssel in the south. It has been claimed that King Harald Fairhair made it part of the unified Norway in about 872, but contemporary sources give rise to doubt that Harald actually ever held the Viken area properly. The earliest proof of Båhus lands being in Norway's hands is from the 11th century.

As long as Norway was a kingdom of its own, the province prospered, and Båhus castle was one of the key fortresses of the kingdom. When Norway was united with Denmark, the province began its decline in wealth; the area was frequently attacked by Swedish forces as part of the larger border skirmishes. The Norwegian fortress, Båhus, was built to protect this territory. Being a border zone towards the Swedish kingdom, and to a lesser extent against Danish lands in Halland, the Båhus region was disproportionately populated by soldier families.

Båhuslen belonged to Denmark-Norway until it was ceded to Sweden in the Treaty of Roskilde in 1658. The fortress of Carlsten was built in Marstrand during the 17th century. For a period, Marstrand was also a free port (porto Franco), with a free religious practice and, as such, home to the only synagogue in Sweden at the time.

The commercial fishing of herring increased in the 18th century, and the province flourished during a major herring period around 1747–1809. Many small fishing communities grew up around the coast.

Before the large scale fishing of herring started, Bohuslän had a considerable forest cover. Timber was once the largest export product and main source of income in Bohuslän. But with the increased importance of fishing, more wood was needed as construction material for houses and boats, and as fuel for herring oil boilers (trankokerier). Deforestation during the 19th century gave rise to today's rugged, rocky landscape.

Culture 
A version of the Götaland dialect of Swedish is spoken in Bohuslän. The province was a part of Norway until 1658 as mentioned above. Traces of Norwegian remain in the dialect. 'Bohuslän', literally means the 'Fief of Bohus', referring to Bohus Fortress and län.

The Nordic Bronze Age (c. 1700–500 BCE) produced rock art showing scenes from the daily life and religious rituals, such as the examples found in Bohuslän. The rock art at Tanum, possibly made earlier, c. 2,500 to 3,000 years ago, have been entered as a site in the UNESCO World heritage program. Rock carvings can be found scattered throughout Bohuslän. The carvings portray the life of an agricultural society with images of daily life, with human figures, religious rituals, ships, circular objects, soles, animals, and fertility figures (e.g. phalluses); and the creation of shallow bowls.

Hundreds 

Hundreds of Sweden were sub-divisions of the Swedish provinces until the early 20th century. Bohuslän's hundreds were:

Bullaren Hundred
Inland Fräkne Hundred
Inland Northern Hundred
Inland Southern Hundred
Inland Torpe Hundred
Kville Hundred
Lane Hundred
Orust Eastern Hundred
Orust Western Hundred
Sotenäs Hundred
Stångenäs Hundred
Sörbygden Hundred
Tanum Hundred
Tjörn Hundred
Tunge Hundred
Vette Hundred
Hisingen Western Hundred

Sports 
Despite the non-administrative status of Bohuslän, some historical functions still remain with football being administered by Bohusläns Fotbollförbund.

Notable people from Bohuslän 
People from Bohuslän are known as bohusläningar.
Percy Barnevik, Uddevalla – businessman
Emilie Flygare-Carlén, Strömstad – author
Emma Jacobsson, Gothenburg – founder of Bohus Stickning
Per Jacobsson – managing director of the International Monetary Fund
Charles Magnus Lindgren, Dragsmark – Swedish-American shipping executive
Ture Malmgren, Uddevalla – journalist and politician
Karl Nordström, Tjörn – artist
Ernst Skarstedt, Kungälv – Swedish-American author, journalist and editor
Lisa Emelia Svensson – UN Ambassador for Oceans
Jon Nödtveidt, Strömstad – Singer and guitar player for the Extreme Metal band Dissection

Gallery

See also 
History of Sweden
Prehistoric Sweden (9,000 BCE–800 CE: Stone and Bronze Ages)
Nordic Stone Age
Nordic Bronze Age
History of Sweden (800–1521 CE) (Viking and Middle Ages)

References 

 article Bohuslän from Nordisk familjebok (1905). In Swedish.

External links 

Bohuslän – Official tourist site
Destination northern Bohuslän
Destination south Bohuslän
Language
The religious background of Bohuslän rock art (PDF)

 
Provinces of Sweden
Rock art in Europe
Nordic Stone Age
Kingdom of Norway (872–1397)